Cyrtodactylus thuongae is a species of gecko, a lizard in the family Gekkonidae. The species is endemic to Vietnam.

Etymology
The specific name, thuongae (Latin, feminine, genitive, singular), is in honor of Thuong Thi Lien Nguyen who is the wife of senior binomial authority Trung My Phung.

Geographic range
C. thuongae is found in southern Vietnam, in Tây Ninh Province.

Habitat

Description

Reproduction
The mode of reproduction of C. thuongae is unknown.

References

Further reading
Phung TM, van Schingen M, Ziegler T, Nguyen TQ (2014). "A third new Cyrtodactylus (Squamata: Gekkonidae) from Ba Den Mountain, Tay Ninh Province, southern Vietnam". Zootaxa 3764 (3): 347–363. (Cyrtodactylus thuongae, new species).

Cyrtodactylus
Reptiles described in 2014